Vice-Admiral J. Robert "Bob" Auchterlonie  (b. July 25, 1969) is a Royal Canadian Navy officer who is currently the Commander Canadian Joint Operations Command - CJOC since 18 June 2021.

Education and career

Auchterlonie joined the Canadian Forces as a ROTP cadet in 1987 and graduated with a Masters in Defence Studies from Royal Military College of Canada in 1991, later completing studies at Canadian Forces Command and Staff College and Naval Command College at the US Naval War College.

He has served in vessels on both coasts for two decades and commanded  from 2007 to 2009.

He was previously Base Commander of CFB Esquimalt from 2012 to 2013 and then served as Commander Canadian Fleet Pacific from July 3, 2013 to June 24, 2015.
On 18 June 2021 he became Commander Canadian Joint Operations Command - CJOC

Personal
Auchterlonie was born in Cumberland, British Columbia and is a married father of two sons.

Awards and decorations
Auchterlonie's personal awards and decorations included the following:

100px

110px

References

Canadian admirals
Living people
Officers of the Order of Military Merit (Canada)
1969 births
Canadian military personnel from British Columbia